Google TV was a smart TV operating system from Google co-developed by Intel, Sony and Logitech. It launched in October 2010 with official devices initially made by Sony and Logitech. Google TV integrated the Android 3.0/3.2 operating system and the Google Chrome web browser to create an interactive television overlay on top of existing online video sites to add a 10-foot user interface, for a smart TV experience.

Google TV's first generation devices were all based on x86 architecture processors and were created and commercialized by Sony and Logitech. The second generation of devices are all based on ARM architecture processors and with additional partners including LG, Samsung, Vizio and Hisense. In 2013, more second generation Google TV-supported devices were announced by new partners, including Hisense, Netgear, TCL, and Asus, some of which include 3D video support.

Google TV was succeeded in June 2014 by Android TV, a newer platform which shares closer ties with the Android platform and has a revamped user experience integrating with Knowledge Graph, and providing casting support from mobile devices. As of June 2014, the Google TV SDK is no longer available, ending any future software development for existing devices and effectively deprecating the platform. The "Google TV" branding has since been used as a replacement for Google Play Movies & TV, and to refer to a user interface used on newer Android TV devices (such as Chromecast with Google TV).

History 

 2010 March – Media outlets reported that the Google TV project was underway, although the partnering companies did not confirm their involvement in the venture until later.
 2010 May 20 – The Google TV project was officially announced at the 2010 Google I/O conference on May 20. Google stated that the new platform would be incorporated directly into new high-definition television sets and Blu-ray Disc players by Sony, although set-top boxes would also be developed by Logitech. The company indicated that the new systems developed by Sony and Logitech would be powered by Intel Atom based CE4100 consumer electronics system-on-chip. It also stated that a "fully optimized" viewer experience would be available through the Dish Network, although the platform would operate through any provider.
 2010 May – Sony announced that it would be releasing its Google-enabled Sony Internet TV product lineup in the fall of 2010, including standalone TV models and set-top units with integrated Blu-ray Disc drives.
 2010 November 10 – Dish Network announced that its Google TV solution was available to customers. Dish Network's Google TV solution, which requires a DVR integration service, includes the Logitech Revue with Google TV, a small set-top box.
 2010 December 15 – Google announces the first Google TV update, with some bug fixes and four major improvements: namely Netflix streaming catalog, Dual View, Remote Control App for Android Phones and Movies search results.
 2011 May 10 – At Google I/O it is announced that Google TV devices will be updated to Android 3.1 Honeycomb, will have access to the Android Market, and have some application updates.
 2011 June 18 – Google acquires SageTV, a home media software developer.
 2011 August 26 – Google has announced Google TV would be officially released in Europe in January 2012.
 2011 October 28 – Google TV starts the roll-out of Google TV 2.0, with the Android 3.1 operating system and access to the Market.
 2012 January 8 – It is announced that the new generation of Google TV devices will run on a variety of ARM SoC designs. One of the key suppliers is Marvell with their Armada 1500 platform.
 2012 January 10 – Sony Corporation plans to bring Google TV to Canada in Summer 2012. No exact released date has been announced. Sony marketing director, Stephane Labrousse has stated that Sony will start selling Google TV based products in Europe in September 2012.
 2012 April 19 – Google updates the TV and Movies app to include social features
 2012 June 25 – Sony plans to release Google TV in Europe in September 2012 with the network media player NSZ-GS7 and the Google TV-integrated Blu-ray player NSZ-GS9 where it will first be released in the UK.
 2012 October 12 – Google video demo of Google TV version 3 is leaked. Version 3 features include an improved Primetime TV guide application, as well as a companion Android application. Voice based TV and web search for models that include a microphone. A Movies & TV Play Store application which will offer, for purchase, streaming video.
 2013 January – Google TV version 3 begins to be rolled out to most Google TV devices.
 2013 May 15 – Google announces that 2nd generation Google TV devices (using ARM CPUs) will be eligible to receive an update to Android 4.2.2 and the latest version of Android Chrome instead of Desktop Chrome.
 2013 October 10 – Report suggests Google will rebrand Google TV to Android TV and that approximately one million Google TV devices are in use.
 2013 October 11 – Google confirms Google TV version 4 will eventually receive native Chromecast like functionality.
 2013 October 24 – LG televisions with Google TV begin to receive the Android 4.2.2 update.

Features 
Google TV leveraged many of Google's existing products. Google TV's operating system, a customized version of Android 3.0/3.2 designed for TV, provided the underlying foundation, allowing developers to create applications that extended the system's functionality. Google's Chrome browser provided a gateway to the Internet, allowing consumers to browse web sites and watch television in tandem. Consumers could access HBO, CNBC, and content from other providers through the Chrome browser. Android and Apple smartphones and tablet computers could be used as remote controls for Google TV. Google TV products shipped with wireless remote controls with a full QWERTY keypad. An update in November 2011 allowed access to Google Play and enabled search to find content from live TV, Netflix, YouTube, HBO GO, Amazon, and more.

Xyologic has compiled a list of the early Google TV apps with the largest number of installations. As of November 2012, the most installed apps were Napster, Pandora Radio and CNBC.

Partners 
The Google TV platform was provided by Google to OEMs for incorporation into their consumer products. The first generation of consumer devices were produced by Logitech and Sony. The second generation of consumer devices were produced by Sony, LG (see LG L9 SoC), Vizio, Hisense, NetGear and Asus. The third generation of consumer devices was announced by LG at 2013 International CES, with the announcement of their TV models.

Devices

First generation

Second generation

Reviews

Competitors and controversies 

Cable providers as well as content providers did not participate in the Google TV platform due to it allowing access through a web browser rather than authenticated apps which could enforce geolocation and international copyright restrictions. NBC, ABC, Fox, CBS/The CW and Hulu blocked Google TV enabled devices from accessing their web content through the platform's entire life. As of November 22, 2010, Google TV devices were also blocked from accessing any programs offered by Viacom's subsidiaries.  Of the cable and satellite providers, only Dish Network (formerly Echostar), had embraced Google TV and promoted it by offering customers a discount on the Logitech Revue. In contrast, the Android TV ecosystem has all the major American television networks and streaming providers' apps.

In January 2014, Google filed a UDRP case against the owner of domain names androidtv.com and xbmcandroidtv.com. The domain names were owned Exo Level, Inc. and were registered with GoDaddy in November 2006.  In March 2014, Google's case was denied.

Version history

See also 
 Google Home
 Home theater PC

References

External links 

TV
Interactive television
Products introduced in 2010
Smart TV

mt:Google TV